The 142nd Ohio Infantry Regiment, sometimes 142nd Regiment, Ohio Volunteer Infantry (or 142nd OVI) was an infantry regiment in the Union Army during the American Civil War.

Service
The 142nd OVI was organized at Camp Chase in Columbus, Ohio, and mustered in May 13, 1864, for 100 days' service under the command of Colonel William Craig Cooper.

The regiment moved to Martinsburg, West Virginia, May 14, 1864; then to Washington, D.C., May 19. Duty at Fort Lyon, near Alexandria, Virginia, until June 3. Attached to 2nd Brigade, DeRussy's Division, XXII Corps. Embarked at Alexandria, Virginia, for White House, Virginia, June 7. Duty guarding supply trains through the Wilderness to the front near Cold Harbor, Virginia, June 9–14. Moved to Point of Rocks, Virginia, and duty there until August 19.

The 142nd OVI mustered out of service September 2, 1864, at Camp Chase.

Ohio National Guard
Over 35,000 Ohio National Guardsmen were federalized and organized into regiments for 100 days' service in May 1864. Shipped to the Eastern Theater, they were designed to be placed in "safe" rear areas to protect railroads and supply points, thereby freeing regular troops for Lt. Gen. Ulysses S. Grant’s push on the Confederate capital of Richmond, Virginia. As events transpired, many units found themselves in combat, stationed in the path of Confederate Gen. Jubal Early’s veteran Army of the Valley during its famed Valley Campaigns of 1864. Ohio Guard units met the battle-tested foe head on and helped blunt the Confederate offensive thereby saving Washington, D.C. from capture. Ohio National Guard units participated in the battles of Monacacy, Fort Stevens, Harpers Ferry, and in the siege of Petersburg. The 142nd OVI did not participate in any battles.

Casualties
The regiment lost 43 men during service; 1 officer and 42 all due to disease.

Commanders
 Colonel William Craig Cooper

Notable members
 Colonel William Craig Cooper - U.S. Representative from Ohio, 1885-1891

See also

 List of Ohio Civil War units
 Ohio in the Civil War

References
 Dyer, Frederick H. A Compendium of the War of the Rebellion (Des Moines, IA: Dyer Pub. Co.), 1908.
 Ohio Roster Commission. Official Roster of the Soldiers of the State of Ohio in the War of the Rebellion, 1861–1865, vol. 9 (141st–184th Regiments–Infantry) (Cincinnati: The Ohio Valley Press), 1889.
 Reid, Whitelaw. Ohio in the War: Her Statesmen, Her Generals, and Soldiers (Cincinnati, OH: Moore, Wilstach, & Baldwin), 1868. 
Attribution

External links
 Ohio in the Civil War: 142nd Ohio Volunteer Infantry by Larry Stevens
 National flag of the 142nd Ohio Infantry

Military units and formations established in 1864
Military units and formations disestablished in 1864
1864 disestablishments in Ohio
Units and formations of the Union Army from Ohio
1864 establishments in Ohio